Carlos Sanz de Santamaría (23 April 1905 – 5 November 1992) was the 18th Permanent Representative of Colombia to the United Nations, and twice served as Ambassador of Colombia to the United States; he also served as the Chairman of the Inter-American Committee on the Alliance for Progress, the precursor of the Organization of American States. A Colombian civil engineer by training, he gained national acclaim for his work in the constructions of the aqueducts of Santa Marta, Riohacha, and Buenaventura, and the Vitelma Water Treatment Plant in Bogotá, and was hoisted to the national stage for his endeavours first as Mayor of Bogotá and then went on to occupy different executive ministries including the Ministry of Foreign Affairs and the Ministry of War, and serving as the 9th Minister of National Economy and the 26th and 41st Minister of Finance and Public Credit of Colombia.

Background
He graduated from the National University of Colombia in 1928 with a bachelor in civil engineering, and moved to France to study at the École Nationale des Ponts et Chaussées, where he received his master's in hydraulic engineering in 1929. He was an associate member of the Societé des Ingenieurs Civiles de France (Engineer Society of France) since 1930, and a member of the Sociedad Colombiana de Ingenieros (Colombian Engineer Society) since 1932, of which it served twice as President.

Selected works

References

Further reading
 

1905 births
1992 deaths
People from Bogotá
National University of Colombia alumni
Colombian civil engineers
Hydraulic engineers
Colombian Liberal Party politicians
Ambassadors of Colombia to the United States
Ministers of Finance and Public Credit of Colombia
Foreign ministers of Colombia
Colombian Ministers of War
Mayors of Bogotá
Permanent Representatives of Colombia to the United Nations